Denmark, including the dependencies Faroe Islands and Greenland, uses six time zones.

Time zones

Central European Time
UTC+01:00 as standard time, and UTC+02:00 as daylight saving time, with transition dates according to the European Union rules.
All of Denmark proper.
Including Copenhagen, Aarhus and Rønne (Bornholm)
The UTC+01:00 centerline (15°E) goes through Bornholm, approximately 2 kilometers from Gudhjem, in the far eastern Denmark, while Copenhagen at 12°34′E corresponds to UTC+0:50, and the west coast at 8°6′E corresponds to UTC+0:32.
The time in Denmark is linked to Earth's rotation, and the clock is 12:00, when the sun is above the 15° Eastern meridian. As Earth's rotation is not completely regular, the time can be offset by up to a half second in either direction, compared to UTC+1. On 14 March 2023, the Folketing adopted a proposal to set the de jure standard time of Denmark, as UTC+1, with exceptions made for Greenland and the Faroe Islands. The proposal will become effective law on 23 March 2023 at 2:00

Western European Time
UTC±00:00 as standard time, and UTC+01:00 as daylight saving time.
The Faroe Islands
The island of Mykines is actually located at 7°36′W longitude and thus at UTC-00:31 (closer to UTC-01:00 than UTC), however Mykines uses the same time zone as the rest of the Faroe Islands.

Greenwich Mean Time
UTC±00:00 year around, no daylight saving time
The northeast coast of Greenland. There are a few settlements, like the weather station Danmarkshavn, otherwise unpopulated.
The area uses same time as Iceland (WET), since it is generally supplied from Iceland. This is however unofficial. In the summer the time is the same as for East Greenland time.

East Greenland Time
UTC-01:00 as standard time, and UTC±00:00 as daylight saving time.
Ittoqqortoormiit, Neerlerit Inaat and surrounding area on the east coast of Greenland

West Greenland Time
UTC-03:00 as standard time, and UTC-02:00 as daylight saving time.
All the west coast of Greenland
Including Qaanaaq, Ilulissat, Kangerlussuaq, Nuuk and Qaqortoq
Tasiilaq and Kulusuk on the east coast
Except the Thule Air Base
Some places, such as Qaanaaq (69°13′W corresponding to UTC-04:37) and Kulusuk (37°11′W corresponding to UTC-02:28) are located outside the UTC-03:00 ± 00:30 zone, but still use the same time zone as the capital Nuuk (51°44′W corresponding to UTC-03:26:56)

Atlantic Time
UTC-04:00 as standard time, and UTC-03:00 as daylight saving time, with transition dates according to the United States rules.
The Thule Air Base

Daylight saving time
All of Greenland uses daylight saving time, except for the northeast coast. The transition dates are according to the European Union rules, except for the Thule Air Base which uses United States transition dates and where the below description is not valid.

Daylight saving time starts at 01:00 UTC on the last Sunday in March and ends same time on the last Sunday in October each year, simultaneously in all affected areas.

This means that in Denmark proper, the transition is at 02:00 local standard time (03:00 daylight saving time), and in the Faroe Islands one hour earlier. In most of Greenland the transition takes place at 22:00 local standard time on the day before (23:00 daylight saving time), four hours before Copenhagen.

History
The first time a common time was used in Denmark, was in 1890, when Copenhagen local time was used as railway time. This was GMT+0:50:20 from Greenwich. In 1890 this time was introduced as a standard time for Denmark. In 1894, Denmark connected to the international time zones, using Greenwich plus one hour. This is the local time of eastern Bornholm, leaving 99.5% of the country west of the time meridian (15°E), which has triggered some sarcastic comments (changing from Copenhagen time to Gudhjem time). However all of the country is located east of Greenwich +00:30 (7.5°E).

Daylight saving time was used in the years 1916, 1940, 1945-1948 and is used from 1980.

The Faroe Islands introduced Greenwich Mean Time in 1908, and Iceland (then a Danish area) introduced GMT-01:00 at the same time (changed to GMT, permanent daylight saving time, in 1968). West Greenland introduced GMT-03:00 in 1916. Daylight saving time was introduced in the Faroe Islands in 1981.

Greenland will move the time zone forward one hour and cease seasonal clock changes in 25 March 2023, after that using UTC-02:00 year around.

IANA time zone database
Data for Denmark directly from zone.tab of the IANA time zone database. Columns marked with * are the columns from zone.tab itself.

References

Time in Denmark